Albert "Alf" Oliver Barber (15 January 1902 – 4 April 1967) was a British boxer who competed in the 1924 Summer Olympics. In 1924 he was eliminated in the quarter-finals of the bantamweight class after losing his fight to the upcoming bronze medalist Jean Ces.

External links

External links
Alf Barber's profile at Sports Reference.com

1902 births
1967 deaths
Bantamweight boxers
Olympic boxers of Great Britain
Boxers at the 1924 Summer Olympics
British male boxers